Deep Creek is a stream of approximately 23 miles which is formed at the confluence of the North Fork Deep Creek and South Fork Deep Creek two miles southwest of the community of Deep Creek, Washington on the far western edge of Spokane County. The creek has its mouth at the Spokane River in Riverside State Park where it cuts a thin canyon through basalt with depths reaching over 600 feet from the land above. The creek and its tributaries flow through mostly rural agricultural areas east of the Spokane urban area, though the headwaters and mouth are both located on state-owned conservation land.

Course
Deep Creek is formed at the confluence of the North Fork Deep Creek and South Fork Deep Creek on the far western edge of Spokane County, one mile north of the community of Espanola and two miles southwest of the community of Deep Creek. North Fork Deep Creek has its source at Audubon Lake in the town of Reardan in neighboring Lincoln County Audubon Lake also serves as the source of Crab Creek which flows west into the Columbia River. The North Fork flows in a southeasterly direction next to U.S. Route 2. South Fork Deep Creek rises two miles south of Reardan and flows in a "U" shape first south-southeast before turning to the northeast at Willon Springs.

About one mile downstream of the confluence the stream turns to the northwest and begins paralleling a nearly 200-foot-tall hillside where the deep nature of the name begins to become apparent. Two miles from the confluence the creek flows through the community to which it gave its name where it passes under U.S. Route 2. A few miles beyond that the creek enters a thin valley roughly 1,000 feet wide carved into the Columbia Plateau with walls rising 200 feet or more.

Four miles from its mouth at the Spokane River, the Deep Creek valley opens up into the valley of Coulee Creek, which flows in from the west. It is here that Deep Creek enters Riverside State Park. Both creeks begin a descent into a thin, deep canyon just before Cable Creek empties into Deep Creek. The canyon is flanked by near vertical basalt walls that are in places vertical cliffs 100 apart. The area is popular with hikers and rock climbers. A bridge carrying the Spokane River Centennial Trail crosses over the creek at its mouth. The community of Nine Mile Falls is located across the Spokane River from the mouth of Deep Creek.

References

Geography of Spokane, Washington
Rivers of Washington (state)
Rivers of Spokane County, Washington